Sikanderpur is a small village in Mat tehsil in Mathura District.

References 

Villages in Mathura district